The Terrorist Asset-Freezing (Temporary Provisions) Act 2010 is an Act of the United Kingdom Parliament that was in force from 10 February 2010 until its repeal on 17 December that same year by the Terrorist Asset-Freezing etc. Act 2010.

Summary

The Terrorist Asset-Freezing (Temporary Provisions) Act 2010 is an Act of the United Kingdom Parliament to make provision for the temporary validity of certain Orders in Council imposing financial restrictions on, and in relation to, persons suspected of involvement in terrorist activity; and for connected purposes. These Orders in Council had been the chosen method of implementation of Resolution 1373 and the directives of the 1267 Committee. The legislation was introduced in the House of Commons on 5 February 2010 and received royal assent on 10 February.

Judgment
The Act was passed following the HM Treasury v Ahmed ruling by the Supreme Court of the United Kingdom on 27 January 2010 that asset-freezing orders made under the United Nations Act 1946 – specifically the Terrorism (United Nations Measures) Order 2009, the Terrorism (United Nations Measures) Order 2006, the Al-Qa’ida and Taliban (United Nations Measures) Order 2002, the Terrorism (United Nations Measures) Order 2001 and the Al-Qaida and Taliban (United Nations Measures) Order 2006 – were unlawful, because the 1946 Act was not intended to authorise coercive measures which interfere with fundamental rights without parliamentary scrutiny:

Multiple persons, multiple orders and a forest of laws, Statutory Orders and UNSC resolutions were considered in the judgment. The applicants pleaded variously that the Treasury Orders were ultra vires for various reasons:
 illegality because it was passed without Parliamentary approval,
 lack of legal certainty and proportionality,
 the absence of procedures that enabled designated persons to challenge their designation,
 by virtue of section 6 of the Human Rights Act 1998 because they were incompatible with Article 8 of the European Convention on Human Rights and with article 1 of Protocol 1 of the ECHR,
 violated client's right of access to a court for an effective remedy.

Lord Phillips concluded that

Legislation
When the court refused to stay its judgement on 4 February, the 2010 Act was passed to retrospectively validate the orders until Parliament could pass new asset-freezing legislation which complied with the court's judgement.

Speaking in the House of Commons on 8 February, Liberal Democrat MP David Heath said of the bill:

Repeal

The Act was repealed by the Terrorist Asset-Freezing etc. Act 2010, a full legislative text with which to implement Resolution 1373.

See also
Terrorism Acts
Council Regulation (EC) No 881/2002
Interpol notice
Rules Publication Act 1893
Hani al-Sibai

References

External links
Explanatory notes from the Office of Public Sector Information website
BBC Democracy Live discussion on the Terrorist Asset-Freezing (Temporary Provisions) Act 2010

United Kingdom Acts of Parliament 2010
Terrorism laws in the United Kingdom
Repealed United Kingdom Acts of Parliament
2010 in British law